Ace Mahbaz (born 25 June 1986) is an actor and writer, known for Small World. He was born in Tehran and raised in Europe, currently residing in London and Berlin.

Personal life 
After attending college, he went to Italy, France, England, currently lives in London and Berlin and became well known in the sign language community by appearing in theatre plays and films in sign languages. He has been deaf since birth and knows 6 languages fluently.

Career 
He started to perform on stage as a teenager and there his interest grew. While living in Italy, he created and performed plays in a few countries around Europe. Following this, he has been at many festivals, including  throughout Europe as an actor, performer in various sign languages like DGS, BSL, LIS, Svenska TS and LSF. He won first place in poetry slam competition (BÄÄM! Der Deaf Slam and Poetry Slam vs. Gebärden Slam) in Berlin twice. His latest play was in A Midsummer Night's Dream as Oberon and Theseus at Shakespeare's Globe. He co-created a sitcom TV series called Small World which he also appears in. He has also featured as an actor in various short films.

Theatre 
Peter Pan (Riksteatern), Actor - 2019
Hem (Riksteatern), Actor - 2019
Festmeny (Teater Manu), Performer - 2015
A Midsummer Night's Dream (at Shakespeare's Globe) Actor - 2014
4Play (Deafinitely theatre) Actor - 2013
Metroworld (On/OFF Compagnie) Actor, Writer - 2011-2014
Amor Jr. (DAVANTI theatre) Actor, Director - 2009-2011
Il cioccolato (DAVANTI theatre) Actor, Director - 2008

Filmography

References 

 Deutsche Gehörlosen-Zeitung "Pendler zwischen Berlin und London" No. 3 2015 March
 Art'Pi Magazine "I'm an autodidact,I like to learn by myself." No. 1, Summer 2001
 
 www.acemahbaz.com

1986 births
21st-century German male actors
21st-century Iranian male actors
Male deaf actors
Deaf writers
Living people
German male film actors
English male actors
German male television actors
English male television actors
Iranian deaf people
BSL users